Union des Employes de Service, Local 298 v Bibeault, [1988] 2 S.C.R. 1048 is a leading decision of the Supreme Court of Canada on judicial review in Canadian administrative law. In this decision the court first described the "pragmatic and functional approach" to determining the standard of review for an administrative decision and provided reasons for its desirability.

Background
A labour dispute in Quebec occurred over whether a subcontractor had to keep the same benefits as its predecessor. The judgment was the original decision that it did not and was maintained.

Opinion
The court replaced the 'preliminary questions' doctrine found in Syndicat des employés de production du Québec et de l'Acadie v. Canada Labour Relations Board, [1984] 2 S.C.R. 412, with the pragmatic and functional approach. This approach involves several considerations, such as the fact that "the court examines not only the wording of the enactment conferring jurisdiction on the administrative tribunal, but the purpose of the statute creating the tribunal, the reason for its existence, the area of expertise of its members and the nature of the problem before the tribunal."

See also
 List of Supreme Court of Canada cases
 Pushpanathan v Canada (Minister of Citizenship and Immigration)

References

External links
 

Canadian administrative case law
Supreme Court of Canada cases
Labour relations in Canada
Canadian labour case law
Service Employees International Union litigation
1988 in Canadian case law
Labour relations in Quebec
Quebec case law